Oumar Pouye (born 19 June 1988 in Niomre, Senegal) is a Senegalese football midfielder.

External links

1988 births
Living people
Senegalese footballers
FC Metz players
Thonon Evian Grand Genève F.C. players
Amiens SC players
RC Strasbourg Alsace players
US Quevilly-Rouen Métropole players
US Créteil-Lusitanos players
Les Herbiers VF players
US Lusitanos Saint-Maur players
Ligue 1 players
Ligue 2 players
Championnat National players
Championnat National 2 players
Championnat National 3 players
Association football midfielders
French sportspeople of Senegalese descent